Pleasant Valley is an unincorporated community in El Dorado County, California.

A post office operated at Pleasant Valley from 1864 to 1917.

References

Unincorporated communities in California
Unincorporated communities in El Dorado County, California